Groom Lake, also called The Visitor, is a 2002 film directed by William Shatner and starring Amy Acker.

Cast
 William Shatner as John Gossner
 Dan Gauthier as Andy
 Amy Acker as Kate
 Tom Towles as Dietz
 Dick Van Patten as Irv Barnett
 John Prosky as Hester Dealt
 Dan Martin as Captain Morgan
 Rickey Medlocke as Rancher
 Duane Whitaker as Dr. Stevens
 Brenda Bakke as Joyce
 J.T. Colosa as J.T.
 Debra Mayer as Nurse in clinic
 Chuck Williams as The Alien

External links

2002 films
Full Moon Features films
American science fiction horror films
Films directed by William Shatner
2002 horror films
2000s science fiction horror films
Films about extraterrestrial life
Films with screenplays by William Shatner
2000s English-language films
2000s American films